In Chancery is the second novel of the Forsyte Saga trilogy by John Galsworthy and was originally published in 1920, some fourteen years after The Man of Property. Like its predecessor it focuses on the personal affairs of a wealthy upper middle class English family.

Synopsis
The novel concentrates on the marital failures of Soames Forsyte and to a lesser extent that of his sister Winifred Dartie and on the building antipathy between Soames and his cousin Young Jolyon Forsyte who develops a friendship with Soames' estranged wife Irene. This friendship eventually leads to an affair and Irene's divorce from Soames.

References
https://www.gutenberg.org/ebooks/2594
https://openlibrary.org/works/OL1167641W/John_Galsworthy

1920 British novels
The Forsyte Saga
Adultery in novels
Novels by John Galsworthy